I'm in Love is a studio album by Swedish singer Sanna Nielsen, released on 2 March 2011. It features her single "I'm in Love", which finished fourth in Melodifestivalen 2011. The album debuted at number three on the Swedish Albums Chart.

Track listing

Note: Track 12 ("Paradise") was included in part (as a bonus track) on Nielsen's 2008 album Stronger.

Charts

Weekly charts

Year-end charts

References

2011 albums
Sanna Nielsen albums